Wang Han is the name of:

Wang Han (diver) (born 1991), Chinese diver
Wang Han (host) (born 1974), Chinese TV show host
Wang Han (poet) ( 8th century), Tang dynasty poet
Wang Han (swimmer) (born 1954), Taiwanese actor and swimmer

See also
Han Wang (disambiguation)